Kwon Hah-nul (or  ; born 7 March 1988) is a South Korean women's football midfielder who plays for Boeun Sangmu.

References

External links
 

1988 births
Living people
South Korean women's footballers
South Korea women's under-17 international footballers
South Korea women's under-20 international footballers
South Korea women's international footballers
WK League players
Women's association football midfielders
2015 FIFA Women's World Cup players
Asian Games medalists in football
Footballers at the 2006 Asian Games
Footballers at the 2010 Asian Games
Footballers at the 2014 Asian Games
FIFA Century Club
Asian Games bronze medalists for South Korea
Medalists at the 2010 Asian Games
Medalists at the 2014 Asian Games
Universiade gold medalists for South Korea
Universiade medalists in football
Medalists at the 2009 Summer Universiade
21st-century South Korean women